Pelican Airlines Pty Ltd, operating as FlyPelican, is an Australian regional airline. It initially operated air charter services and subsequently commenced scheduled flights on 1 June 2015. The airline is based in Newcastle in New South Wales. Its main base is Newcastle Airport. The airline was formed by former Aeropelican staff using former Aeropelican aircraft.  The company slogan is Fly Local, Fly Pelican.

Destinations

As of November 2019, FlyPelican operates to the following destinations:

Australian Capital Territory
 Canberra 
 Canberra Airport
New South Wales
 Ballina
 Ballina Byron Gateway Airport
 Bathurst
 Bathurst Airport
 Cobar
 Cobar Airport
 Dubbo
Dubbo Airport
 Mudgee
 Mudgee Airport
 Newcastle
 Newcastle Airport
 Sydney
 Kingsford Smith Airport
 Port Macquarie
 Port Macquarie Airport

Terminated destinations
New South Wales
Taree
 Taree Airport
South Australia
 Adelaide
 Adelaide Airport (operated March 2018 to April 2019 by Alliance Airlines)

Queensland

Sunshine Coast Airport

Fleet 

As of September 2018, the FlyPelican fleet consists of the following aircraft:

See also
List of airlines of Australia

References

External links
 Official website

Airlines established in 2014
Australian companies established in 2014
Airlines of Australia
Companies based in Newcastle, New South Wales
Regional Aviation Association of Australia